Nay-1-1 is a 2012 Philippine television infotainment show broadcast by GMA Network. Hosted by Jaya and Gladys Reyes, it premiered on November 12, 2012. The show concluded on December 28, 2012 with a total of 35 episodes.

Overview

The show puts the two hosts on an important mission, which is to keep wives and mothers from losing their sanity at home! They do this by extending help to solve problems at home, giving tips, advice, and also a little time for fun and enjoyment.

The show also has an "Emergency Mommy Tracker" which shows exactly where the emergency is on an iPad. The moms can text the show through the number 4627 and via email through the show's official Facebook page and Twitter.

Ratings
According to AGB Nielsen Philippines' Mega Manila household television ratings, the pilot episode of Nay-1-1 earned a 5.1% rating. While the final episode scored a 6.5% rating.

References

2012 Philippine television series debuts
2012 Philippine television series endings
Filipino-language television shows
GMA Network original programming
Infotainment
Philippine television shows